Salmon Arm is a city in the Columbia Shuswap Regional District of the Southern Interior of the Canadian province of British Columbia that has a population of 17,706 (2016). Salmon Arm was incorporated as a municipal district on May 15, 1905. The city of Salmon Arm separated from the district in 1912, but was downgraded to a village in 1958. In 1970, the city of Salmon Arm once again reunited with the District Municipality. Salmon Arm once again became a city in 2005, and is now the location of the head offices of the Columbia-Shuswap Regional District. It is a tourist town in the summer, with many beaches, camping facilities and house boat rentals. Salmon Arm is home to the longest wooden freshwater wharf in North America.

Etymology 
Salmon Arm takes its name from its place along Shuswap Lake. The lake has four "arms": Shuswap Arm in the west, Seymour Arm in the north, Anstey Arm in the northeast, and Salmon Arm in the south, named after the large runs of salmon that used to run up the creeks that empty into the lake. The city of Salmon Arm takes its name from its location along the Salmon Arm of Shuswap Lake.

History
Salmon Arm is located within the traditional territory of the Secwépemc. Much has been written about the history of Salmon Arm following the laying of the Canadian Pacific Railway in September 1885. While miners and settlers looked for gold in the surrounding areas, the beaches of Salmon Arm lay virtually untouched.  By the end of the 1890s, the town had grown to include many new buildings such as two general stores, a school, and a hotel. The population had also grown to include over 200 citizens.

By 1904, Salmon Arm had acquired a reputation for having an excellent fruit harvest. The local businessmen grew fruit as a main export, sending it to the larger, more populated towns that surrounded it.

In May 1905, a formal local government was started by the request of its citizens. Later on, in 1912, Salmon Arm upgraded its town status to an official city.

In 1951, Princess Elizabeth, Duchess of Edinburgh and Prince Philip, Duke of Edinburgh visited Salmon Arm while on a royal tour of Canada.

On August 8, 1982, while Prime Minister Pierre Elliott Trudeau and his sons passed through Salmon Arm, they were confronted by three demonstrators protesting "high unemployment and the way the Prime Minister was handling the economy." Trudeau infamously gave the protesters the finger; his gesture was caught on a single television camera and immediately used by some as, "a vivid symbol for those who thought the Liberal prime minister arrogant and hostile to Western Canada." However, to many Trudeau's response was seen as a commemorated joke. Only a month after the incident T-shirts, which depicted a caricature of Trudeau leaning out of a train with his middle finger raised, were being produced and sold to the citizens of Salmon Arm.

In 1998, an area of 13,500 acres (34 km2 or just over 5000 hectares) immediately southwest of Salmon Arm was burnt to the extent of deforestation by a wildfire started by lightning. An emergency evacuation was executed as the fire got closer. Remarkably, just as the fire reached the valley floor, a sudden change of wind direction forced the fire back on itself, extinguishing it. The fire came so close that trees in many backyards were singed and barn paint was peeled. The media reported "20 homes and 15 barns" were destroyed during the firestorm in the Silver Creek area to the south of Salmon Arm, which also produced Canada's largest civil evacuation up to that date when the "5,000-hectare forest fire that forced the removal of 7,000 residents of Salmon Arm was being blown toward the town."

Geography
Salmon Arm is on the shores of Shuswap Lake, where the Salmon River empties into the Salmon Arm reach of the Lake. Directly south of the city lies Mount Ida, to the west Fly Hills, and across Shuswap Lake lies Bastion Mountain.

Climate

Demographics 

Ethnicity

Religion 
According to the 2021 census, religious groups in Salmon Arm included:
Irreligion (10,275 persons or 55.2%)
Christianity (7,780 persons or 41.8%)
Islam (115 persons or 0.6%)
Sikhism (100 persons or 0.5%)
Buddhism (70 persons or 0.4%)
Judaism (15 persons or 0.1%)
Other (245 persons or 1.3%)

Economy 
The largest employer in the Salmon Arm area is the forest industry and related businesses; however, due to economic conditions, the former Federated Co-Op sawmill has been out of operation since Dec. 21, 2007, although the co-located plywood production facility has generally remained operational. The plywood plant is owned by Gorman Bros. Lumber Ltd who purchased it from Federated Co-operatives Ltd. in 2012. The city benefits from access to the mainline of the Canadian Pacific Railway, which passes through the city.

Many tourists come to Salmon Arm from Vancouver, Calgary and Asia. Most tourists arrive during the summer season, either stopping en route to other holiday destinations or to visit Shuswap Lake, often via rental houseboats and which has recreation residential communities and campgrounds all around its shores. Salmon Arm has several hotels, campsites and houseboat rental outlets.

Education 
Public schools in Salmon Arm are part of School District 83 North Okanagan-Shuswap; within the city limits, there are currently five elementary schools (kindergarten to Grade 7), one middle school (Grades 6 to 8), and a secondary school with two campuses. Salmon Arm offers early French immersion, late French immersion and outdoor learning programs. Several elementary schools outside the city limits, including one combined elementary/middle school feed into the middle school and secondary school in Salmon Arm. Salmon Arm also offer a private Christian School (Kings Christian School). The current division of education grades between the different categories of schools began in 2007; prior to 2007, elementary schools within the city limits offered kindergarten to Grade 7, followed by two junior high schools with Grades 8 to 10, and a single senior secondary school with Grades 11 and 12. School District 83 also has its administrative offices (located in the town centre) and maintenance complex (located in the community's main industrial park) in Salmon Arm.

Salmon Arm is one of four Okanagan College campuses; it offers a range of academic and vocational programs. 

Notable academics with ties to Salmon Arm include David Lethbridge and Mike Worobey. David Lethbridge is a retired Professor of Psychology and the author of Norman Bethune in Spain: Commitment, Crisis and Conspiracy. Mike Worobey is winner of the Nora and Ted Sterling Prize in Support of Controversy for 2009 from Simon Fraser University and is known for research on COVID-19 pandemic beginnings.

Culture 
The summer months are when the city experiences its largest fluctuation of population with people on holidays coming to visit the city and surrounding area. During every third weekend of August, the annual Salmon Arm Roots and Blues festival draws large crowds of festival-goers with an international roster of performers. The Festival emerged from the Shuswap Coffee House movement of the 1970s and 1980s, which by 1991 had coalesced into the non-profit Salmon Arm Folk Music Society, the Festival's founding body. From its grassroots beginnings, Roots & Blues has grown into the largest and most musically diverse festival in the British Columbian interior. After two years of virtual festival pre-recorded performances (2020 & 2021), the Festival resumes an in-person event for its 30th anniversary in 2022. There is also the annual Word on the Lake Writers’ Festival organized by the Shuswap Association of Writers (SAW). For 17 years it was held at the Prestige Inn in Salmon Arm, though its 2022 venue will be located in Sorrento.

Salmon Arm is home to a multiplex movie theatre (Salmar Grand) and a single screen theatre for movies and live stage performances (Salmar Classic); both are owned and operated by a non-profit community organization, the Salmar Community Association.  Additionally, a community theatre society hosts plays and other live stage performances (Shuswap Theatre) in a building across the street from the Salmar Grand multiplex.

The RJ Haney Heritage Park & Museum is Salmon Arm's main museum, and celebrates the history of the region. The museum often offers a dinner theatre program during the summer months, with the theatre component offering plays based on local history.

Salmon Arm is home to a branch of Okanagan Regional Library (ORL), which is currently located in Piccadilly Mall.

The Salmon Arm public art gallery is the Salmon Arm Art Gallery, housed in a historic building owned by the city and operated by Shuswap District Arts Council. The building was originally a post office, and later housed the Salmon Arm branch of Okanagan Regional Library for many years.

Sports and recreation
Large crowds of tourists and locals are drawn to the beaches at Sunnybrae, Canoe, and elsewhere on Shuswap Lake during the summer. The city has many large hotels, as well as berths for a number of houseboats.

The community offers a number of recreational facilities and sports leagues. There are fields for soccer/rugby/football, fields for baseball/softball, as well as a 6 sheet curling rink (SACC), five-pin bowling lanes (lakeside lanes bowling center), several golf courses and many seasonal recreational businesses. The proximity of the Shuswap Lake has also resulted in a growing interest in rowing and paddling sports, particularly dragon boat racing.

The Salmon Arm Silverbacks hockey team, in the BCHL, plays at Shaw Centre (formerly the Sunwave Centre). The publicly owned twin ice rink facility is named in relation to the facility's community sponsor, Shaw Cable (which purchased the local, independent cable service provider SunCountry Cablevision in June 2011; SunCountry had branded its highspeed cable Internet service as Sunwave.net, and had sponsored the ice rink facility under the name Sunwave Centre). Co-located in the same area with the Shaw Centre are the city's recreation centre (with pool, racquet courts, weight facility and auditorium/gymnasium), curling rink, lawn bowling facility, horseshoe pitch, and the Salmon Arm campus of Okanagan College. The city's previous indoor ice arena, Memorial Arena, has been repurposed as an indoor field sports facility, and is heavily used by such sports as soccer, rugby, and archery. Memorial Arena, with sponsorship from the Salmon Arm Savings & Credit Union has been rebranded as the SASCU Memorial Recreation Centre, while the main recreation centre is similarly sponsored and branded the SASCU Recreation Centre.

Former NHL player Dave Scatchard was raised in Salmon Arm, playing his minor hockey there. Other notable athletes raised in or with ties to Salmon Arm are swimmer Rick Say and curler Sandra Jenkins.

Transportation
Salmon Arm lies on the Trans-Canada Highway approximately halfway between Vancouver and Calgary. It is also at the top of Highway 97, which leads to Vernon and Kelowna. The economy benefits from through traffic; many brand-name hotels and restaurants have opened in the past few decades.

The Canadian Pacific Railway also runs through Salmon Arm. No passenger service is available, though the Rocky Mountaineer trains pass through on occasion.

Salmon Arm Airport mainly serves general aviation aircraft, though scheduled service to Vancouver and Calgary was available by Northern Hawk Aviation until it ceased operations.

Salmon Arm has a bus network that serves neighbourhoods and shopping destinations using commuter minibuses on hourly schedules. It also offers handyDart service for the disabled and scheduled services to communities across the region once per week.

Damage from 1998 wildfire
In 1998, an area of 13,500 acres (about 55 km2 or 5500 hectares) immediately southwest of Salmon Arm was burnt to the extent of deforestation by a wildfire started by lightning. The fire came down from the Fly Hills in the west and embers carried by the wind jumped the valley and ignited Mount Ida. Flames raced down both sides of the valley, threatening many homes. An emergency evacuation was executed as the fire hotfooted it closer. Remarkably, just as the fire reached the valley floor, a sudden change of wind direction forced the fire back on itself, extinguishing it. The fire came so close that trees in many backyards were singed and barn paint was peeled.

The media reported "20 homes and 15 barns" were destroyed during the firestorm in the Silver Creek area to the south of Salmon Arm, which also produced Canada's largest civil evacuation up to that date when the "5,000-hectare forest fire that forced the removal of 7,000 residents of Salmon Arm was being blown toward the town."

Sister city
 Salmon Arm's sister city is Inashiki, Ibaraki, Japan (Formerly Azuma, Ibaraki, Japan, until its recent amalgamation into Inashiki). There is a pavilion near McGuire Lake in honour of the friendship between Japan and Salmon Arm.

Notable people
 Gail Anderson-Dargatz – author
 Calvin Ayre – entrepreneur
 Dan Bremnes – Christian musician, resident of Salmon Arm
 Brian Drummond, voice actor
 Cody Franson – NHL player, defenceman for the Nashville Predators
 E.V. Gordon – a well-known medieval philologist and colleague of J.R.R. Tolkien, was born in Salmon Arm in 1896
 Curtis Lazar – NHL player, captain of Team Canada at the World Junior 2015
 Justin Maas - Visual Artist & Author
 Jesse Mast – country music singer-songwriter
 Rick Say – a 3-time Olympic and national record holding swimmer
 Dave Scatchard – a former NHL player
 Greg Sczebel – a two-time Juno Award-winning independent singer/songwriter
 Bev Smith – renowned basketball player and coach
 Richard Underhill – jazz saxophonist and 2003 Juno Award winner
 Natalie Wilkie – Paralympic Champion, cross-country skiing
 Michael Worobey - evolutionary biologist and professor at the University of Arizona

In popular culture
 The Punch-Out!! character Bear Hugger resides in Salmon Arm. Additionally, he even has an attack of the same name.

Notes

References

External links 

 
Cities in British Columbia
Populated places established in 1905
1905 establishments in Canada